William Hobson (born January 23, 1991), better known by the ring name Powerhouse Hobbs, is an American professional wrestler signed to All Elite Wrestling (AEW), where he is the current AEW TNT Champion in his first reign.

Early life 
Hobson attended Sequoia High School in Redwood City, California, where he played football and other sports. As a youth, he attended professional wrestling events, including SuperBrawl VIII in the Cow Palace in San Francisco, California.

Professional wrestling career

Independent circuit (2009–2020) 
After graduating from high school, Hobson attended the All Pro Wrestling (APW) professional wrestling school in Hayward, California. He made his professional wrestling debut on July 18, 2009 at APW's "Gym Wars" event under the ring name "Will Rood". Hobson wrestled for APW over the following decade, during which time he held the APW Worldwide Internet Championship three times. He also held the APW Tag Team Championship thrice, teaming with Marcus Lewis as "Lion Power". In 2014 he briefly used the ring name "Will.I.IS"; in 2016 he changed his ring name to "Will Hobbs".

Between 2011 and 2020 Hobson also appeared with multiple independent promotions, principally in the San Francisco Bay Area. These included Championship Wrestling from Hollywood (where he held the UWN Tag Team Championship with Damien Grundy as "Cold Cold War"), Gold Rush Pro Wrestling (where he held the GRPW Dynamite Division Championship), and Pro Championship Wrestling (where he held the PCW Tag Team Championship with Mitch Valentine as "the Dream Team"). In 2016, Hobson made a one-off appearance for WWE, losing to Baron Corbin in a dark match in the SAP Center in San Jose, California.

All Elite Wrestling (2020–present)

Team Taz (2020–2022) 

In July 2020, Hobson began to work for All Elite Wrestling (AEW) as "Will Hobbs", wrestling on its YouTube show AEW Dark. On September 5, 2020, Hobbs competed in a 21-man Casino Battle Royale at the All Out pay-per-view, which was won by Lance Archer. His performance in the match impressed AEW president Tony Khan, and he was signed to a contract with AEW. On the September 16, 2020 episode of Dynamite, Hobbs saved AEW World Champion Jon Moxley from an attack by Brian Cage and Ricky Starks. On the October 7 episode of Dynamite, Hobbs unsuccessfully challenged Cage for the FTW Championship. On the November 18 episode of Dynamite, Hobbs turned heel by aligning himself with Team Taz (Taz, Brian Cage, and Ricky Starks), joining them in an attack on Cody Rhodes and Darby Allin. Later that month, his ring name was tweaked to "Powerhouse Hobbs". At the December 2, 2020 television special Winter Is Coming, Hobbs and Starks lost to Rhodes and Allin.

Throughout early 2021, Hobbs scored a series of singles and tag team victories on episodes of AEW Dark and AEW Dark: Elevation. At the Double or Nothing pay-per-view in May 2021, Hobbs competed in a Casino Battle Royale that was won by Jungle Boy. On July 14, 2021 on the Fyter Fest television special, Hobbs aided stablemate Ricky Starks in an FTW Championship victory over Brian Cage, thus expelling Cage from Team Taz; Hobbs went on to defeat Cage on the September 1 episode of Dynamite. On the September 15, 2021 episode of Dynamite, Team Taz attacked CM Punk while he was on commentary, resulting in a match between Hobbs and Punk at the AEW Grand Slam television special (Punk's first televised match in over seven years), which was won by Punk. For the remainder of the year, Hobbs wrestled primarily on AEW Dark.

In March 2022 at Revolution, Hobbs competed in a Face of the Revolution ladder match that was won by Wardlow. Throughout mid-2022, he largely competed in tag team matches alongside Starks; at Double or Nothing in May 2022 they unsuccessfully challenged Jurassic Express for the AEW World Tag Team Championship in a triple threat match that also featured Keith Lee and Swerve Strickland. At Dynamite: Fight for the Fallen on July 27, 2022, Hobbs turned on Starks after Starks lost the FTW Championship, delivering a clothesline to the back of Starks' neck followed by a spinebuster. The following week, Taz formally disbanded Team Taz. At All Out in September 2022, Hobbs defeated Starks; later that month, on Grand Slam, Starks defeated Hobbs in a lights out match.

TNT Champion (2022–present) 
At Full Gear in November 2022, Hobbs faced Samoa Joe and Wardlow in a three-way dance for the AEW TNT Championship that was won by Samoa Joe. In March 2023, Hobbs won a Face of the Revolution ladder match, giving him a shot at the TNT Championship. On the following episode of Dynamite, Hobbs (with assistance from Q. T. Marshall) defeated Wardlow in a falls count anywhere match to win the TNT Championship for the first time.

Professional wrestling style and persona 
Hobbs wrestles in a "powerhouse" style. His finishing moves have included a falling powerslam, a spinebuster, an Oklahoma Stampede, a frog splash, a torture rack, a burning hammer, and an emerald flowsion named the Town Business.

Personal life 
Hobson was raised by his grandparents, and he states that his love of professional wrestling came through his grandparents who regularly watched and attended wrestling shows at the Cow Palace. When Hobson was 21, his older brother was killed by gunfire; they had aspirations of being a manager-wrestler duo in professional wrestling. Hobson was also injured in the shooting, taking a bullet in his forearm. Hobson has two sons and one daughter.

Championships and accomplishments 
All Elite Wrestling
AEW TNT Championship (1 time, current)
Face of the Revolution ladder match (2023) 
All Pro Wrestling
APW Tag Team Championship (3 times) – with Marcus Lewis
APW Worldwide Internet Championship (3 times)
Championship Wrestling from Hollywood
UWN Tag Team Championship (1 time) – with Damien Grundy
Gold Rush Pro Wrestling
GRPW Dynamite Division Championship (1 time)
GRPW Dynamite Division Championship Tournament (2013)
Pro Championship Wrestling
PCW Tag Team Championship (1 time) – with Mitch Valentine
 Pro Wrestling Illustrated
 Ranked #93 of the top 500 singles wrestlers in the PWI 500 in 2021

References

External links 
 
 
 
 

1991 births
21st-century African-American sportspeople
21st-century professional wrestlers
AEW TNT Champions
African-American male professional wrestlers
All Elite Wrestling personnel
American male professional wrestlers
American shooting survivors
Living people
People from East Palo Alto, California
Professional wrestlers from California